Eupelix is a genus of true bug belonging to the family Cicadellidae.

The genus was first described by Germar in 1821.

The species of this genus are found in Europe.

Species:
 Eupelix cuspidata (Fabricius, 1775)

References

Cicadellidae
Hemiptera genera